Carassai is a comune (municipality) in the Province of Ascoli Piceno in the Italian region Marche, located about  south of Ancona and about  northeast of Ascoli Piceno.

Carassai borders the following municipalities: Cossignano, Montalto delle Marche, Monte Vidon Combatte, Montefiore dell'Aso, Ortezzano, Petritoli, Ripatransone.

References

External links
 Official website

Cities and towns in the Marche